Biriatou is a village and a commune in the Pyrénées-Atlantiques department in southwestern France. It is part of the traditional Basque province of Labourd.

The village lies on the edge of a hill rising east to the minor mount Xoldokogaina (486 m), the first noticeable prominence across the Spanish-French border at the lower Bidasoa. The hiking trail GR 10 crosses the village, heading east through the southern side of Xoldokogaina.

European road carriers and travellers are acquainted with the name, Basque for 'gate/pass of the way' (bide + ate), on account of the border customs and toll at the AP-8 - A-63 motorway to the west of the actual village, often jammed with vehicles and long queues.

See also
Communes of the Pyrénées-Atlantiques department

References

Communes of Pyrénées-Atlantiques
Pyrénées-Atlantiques communes articles needing translation from French Wikipedia